Barly is a commune in the Somme department in Hauts-de-France in northern France.

Geography
Situated halfway between Abbeville and Arras at the junction of the D59 and D196 roads and on the border of the departments of the Somme and the Pas-de-Calais.

Population

See also
Communes of the Somme department

References

Communes of Somme (department)